1822, subtitled How a wise man, a sad princess and a money crazy Scotsman helped D. Pedro to create Brazil, a country that had everything to go wrong (in Portuguese: Como um homem sábio, uma princesa triste e um escocês louco por dinheiro ajudaram D. Pedro a criar o Brasil, um país que tinha tudo para dar errado), is a non-fiction historical book written by Laurentino Gomes, the author of 1808, and edited by Nova Fronteira.

The name of the book refers to the year in which Prince Pedro declared the independence of Brazil with the well-remembered "Cry of Ipiranga". It is a comprehensive study of the beginnings of independent life in a giant country in the New World.

The book is dedicated to all Brazilian history teachers.

In 2011, the book earned Gomes his third and fourth Jabuti Prizes, in the categories "best reportage-book" and "non-fiction book of the year".

Main characters
 Dom Pedro (the Emperor)
 José Bonifácio de Andrada e Silva (the wise man)
 Dona Leopoldina (the sad princess)
 Lord Cochrane (the money-crazy Scotsman)
 Marquesa de Santos (the marchioness)

See also
 1808

References

2010 non-fiction books
Books about Brazil
History books about the 19th century
21st-century history books
Pedro I of Brazil